Glenn Sorensen (b. 1968) is an artist born in Australia who now lives and works in Sweden. He studied at the City Art Institute, Sydney, Australia between 1986 and 1988 and at the Academy of Fine Arts, Helsinki, Finland.Glenn has two sons, Bruno and Hugo.

References

Further reading 
 "An Explanation" by Glenn Sorensen, Malmö, Sweden, 1998
 "Superiride, arte e ironia del profondo Nord" by Ela Caroli, Il Corriere del Mezzogiomo, Naples, December 1, 1999.
 "Mostra. Da Trisorio e da Raucci e Santamaria" by Stafania Zuliani, Il Mattino, November 30, 1999, p. 35.
 "Superiride" by Simona Barucco, Flash Art no. 219, December 1999 - January 2000.
 "Extended Painting - Monica de Cardenas" by Luca Beatrice, Flash Art Italia, no. 228, June/July 2001.
 "Glenn Soerensen" by Mark Wilsher, What's On, December 2001 .
 "Janssen e Sorensen" by D. Ricci, Il Mattino, Napoli, March 8, 2001.
 "Glenn Sorensen" by Jennifer Higgie (ed.), Artimo, 2001.
 "Twan Janssen - Glenn Sorensen" interview with the artist by Claudia Marfella, Le Pagine dell'Ozio no. 3, March 16–22, 2001.
 "Twan Janssen - Glenn Sorensen" by Filippo Romeo, Flash Art no. 227, April–May 2001.
 Mario Testino's Art Index, V. Magazine - Homme Boy - New York, May–June 2001.
 "Glenn Sorensen" by Roy Exley, Flash Art International no. 222, January–February 2002.
 "Focus Painting Part II", Flash Art International, November/December 2002.
 "Glenn Sorensen" by Bera Nordal and Glenn Sorensen, The Nordic Watercolour Museum, 2003.
 "Glenn Sorensen" by Jennifer Coates, Tema Celeste, March/April, Issue 96, 2003.
 "Händelser bland lego och vardagliga ting" by Anna Berglund, ST-Tidningen, June 4, 2003.
 "Fin Summerutställning på akvarellmuseet" by Nen Arnell, Bohusläningen med Dals Dagbladet. June 5, 2003.
 "Manliga Konstnärer?" by Ann-Charlotte Glasberg, Göteborg Posten, July 5, 2003.
 "Glenn Sorensen" by Joyce Korotkin, Gasser and Grunert. inc., M, January 2003.
 "Allvarligt men roligt på akvarellmuseet" by A.M. Ljungberg, GT, May 30, 2003.
 "Akvarell-stilar med tre ansikten" by U. Sundström, Göteborgs Posten, May 31, 2003.
 "Akvareller från tre olika världar" by M. Andersson, Stenungsunds Posten med Orust-Tjörn, June 13, 2003.
 "Glenn Sorensen" by Karen Rosenberg, Frieze, April 2003.
 "Glenn Sorensen" by Jessica Lack, The Guide - The Guardian, January 31 - February 6, 2004.
 "Glenn Sorensen" by Rebecca Geldard, Time Out London, February 25 - March 3, 2004.
 "Da Sorensen a Davide..." by S. De Stefano, Corriere del Mezzogiorno, March 26, 2004.
 "Glenn Sorensen" by Francesco Galdieri, Tema Celeste no. 103, Italian edition, 2004.
 "Glenn Sorensen, Suspension, isolation, anticipation; frozen moments, ghostly flowers and floodlit nights", by Jennifer Higgie, Frieze, Issue 129, March 2010, pp. 104–105.

Living people
Australian contemporary artists
Swedish contemporary artists
Year of birth missing (living people)